Syed Ali Qutab Shah Rizvi was a member of the Pakistani Sindh Provincial Assembly in the 1970s and 1980s, representing the district of Tharparkar. He served in the fifth (1972–1977), sixth (1977), and eighth (1988–1990) assemblies.

References

Pakistani politicians
20th-century births
Living people
Year of birth missing (living people)